The 1999 Kremlin Cup was a tennis tournament played on indoor carpet courts at the Olympic Stadium in Moscow in Russia that was part of the International Series of the 1999 ATP Tour and of Tier I of the 1999 WTA Tour. The men's tournament was held from 8 November through 14 November 1998, while the women's tournament was held from 18 October through 24 October 1999. Yevgeny Kafelnikov and Nathalie Tauziat won the singles titles.

WTA entrants

Seeds

Other entrants
The following players received wildcards into the singles main draw:
  Tatiana Panova
  Lina Krasnoroutskaya

The following players received wildcards into the doubles main draw:
  Lina Krasnoroutskaya /  Elena Makarova

The following players received entry from the qualifying draw:

  Elena Tatarkova
  Nadia Petrova
  Elena Dementieva
  Anastasia Myskina

  Sarah Pitkowski /  Ekaterina Sysoeva

The following player received entry as a lucky loser:
  Kimberly Po

Finals

Men's singles

 Yevgeny Kafelnikov defeated  Byron Black 7–6(7–2), 6–4
 It was Kafelnikov's 3rd title of the year and the 20th of his career.

Women's singles

 Nathalie Tauziat defeated  Barbara Schett 2–6, 6–4, 6–1
 It was Tauziat's 1st title of the year and the 5th of her career.

Men's doubles

 Justin Gimelstob /  Daniel Vacek defeated  Andriy Medvedev /  Marat Safin 6–2, 6–1
 It was Gimelstob's 5th title of the year and the 7th of his career. It was Vacek's 4th title of the year and the 24th of his career.

Women's doubles

 Lisa Raymond /  Rennae Stubbs defeated  Julie Halard-Decugis /  Anke Huber 6–1, 6–0
 It was Raymond's 4th title of the year and the 13th of her career. It was Stubbs's 4th title of the year and the 18th of her career.

External links
 Official website 
 Official website 
 ATP Tournament Profile
 WTA Tournament Profile

Kremlin Cup
Kremlin Cup
Kremlin Cup
Kremlin Cup
Kremlin Cup
Kremlin Cup
Kremlin Cup